Alajärvi church, also known as the Church of Gabriel (Finnish: Gabrielin kirkko), is the main Lutheran church in the city of Alajärvi, Finland.

Architecture
The church was designed by the leading architect operating in Finland at the time, Carl Ludvig Engel, completed in 1836 and consecrated in 1841. It is designed in the neoclassical style, and constructed of timber, under a tarred wood shingle roof. There is a standalone bell tower next to the church.

The main altarpiece was created in 1907 by the Finnish, Alajärvi-born post-impressionist artist Verner Thomé, and depicts Jesus's agony in the Gethsemane.

In 1896, the church was refurbished, adding an internal balcony with seating, bringing the total seating capacity to 1,200, although in its current configuration it seats  1,000.

The church, along with the city centre public and administrative buildings complex designed by the Finnish architect Alvar Aalto, has been designated and protected by the Finnish Heritage Agency as a nationally important built cultural environment (Valtakunnallisesti merkittävä rakennettu kulttuuriympäristö).

Gallery

References

External links

Lutheran churches in Finland
Churches completed in 1836
Carl Ludvig Engel buildings
19th-century Lutheran churches
Alajärvi
19th-century churches in Finland
Neoclassical church buildings in Finland